Christopher D. Lewis COM (born 1957) was a career police officer and former Commissioner of the Ontario Provincial Police. He retired from the position on March 29, 2014.

Early career
Born in Sault Ste. Marie, Ontario, Lewis has been with the Ontario Provincial Police since 1978. His first posting was as a constable in Kapuskasing, Ontario. He was promoted through the ranks.

Deputy Commissioner
He was appointed Deputy Commissioner of Field Operations by Fantino effective January 1, 2007. As Deputy Commissioner, Lewis oversaw the creation of the OPP's aboriginal policing bureau and has studied aboriginal government and law. He has been in charge of the OPP's operation managing the conflict between Native protesters and non-Native residents in Caledonia throughout his tenure as deputy commissioner.

Commissioner
Lewis' appointment was announced in July 2010 and became effective on August 1.

Education
Lewis is a graduate of the FBI Academy in Quantico, Virginia, as well as of a course in Homicide from the Harvard Associates in Police Science Homicide, Aboriginal Government and Law program at Athabasca University and is also a graduate of the Applied Management program at Northwood University.

Family
Lewis is married to OPP Chief Superintendent (Field Support Bureau and formerly Central Region) Angie Howe.  He has two adult daughters with his ex-wife.

Career highlights
 Officer, Smooth Rock Falls Detachment
 Officer, London Detachment
 Tactics and Rescue Unit.
 Commander of Eastern Region
 Commander of the Investigation, Investigation Support
 Commander of Information and Technology Services Bureau
 Commander of Emergency Management Bureau.

Awards
 Order of Merit of the Police Forces - Officer and later as Commander of the Order
 Queen Elizabeth II Golden Jubilee Medal
 Queen Elizabeth II Diamond Jubilee Medal
 Police Exemplary Service Medal

References

Commissioners of the Ontario Provincial Police
Living people
People from Sault Ste. Marie, Ontario
1957 births